The Taizhou Wu (台州片) is a Southern Wu Chinese language spoken  in and around Taizhou in Zhejiang province. It is to some extent mutually intelligible with Taihu Wu.

Dialects
Taizhou proper is the chief and representative dialect.
Taizhou dialect
Linhai dialect
Sanmen dialect
Tiantai dialect
Xianju dialect
Huangyan dialect (黃巖話/黄岩话 )
Jiaojiang dialect
Wenling dialect
Yuhuan dialect
Yueqing dialect
Ninghai dialect

References

Further reading
 

Wu Chinese
Taizhou, Zhejiang

zh:台州片